Dak Cheung is a district (muang) of Sekong province in southeastern Laos.

Governor 
The District Governor of Dak Cheung District (2017) is Mr. Laysouane Midsouvanh (ໄລສວນ ມິດສຸວັນ).

References

Districts of Sekong province